Mark Stephen Allott (born 3 October 1977) is an English former footballer.

Career

Oldham Athletic 
Allott initially came through the youth ranks and was highly rated as a centre forward, scoring on his debut as a substitute in a defeat against Bolton Wanderers at Burnden Park in October 1996. When Manager Neil Warnock left the club in 1998 and took a lot of the first team with him Allott featured more in Andy Ritchie's team. His second season saw him finish the campaign as top goalscorer with 12 goals and the following season he was ever present and finished with 8 goals. However, in the Summer of 2001, the club was taken over by millionaire Chris Moore who promised to bring in better quality players and despite Allott starting the season in the first team when manager Ritchie was sacked in early November new manager Mick Wadsworth had the money to bring in his own players and he was loaned out and eventually sold to Chesterfield in January 2002.

Chesterfield 

At Chesterfield, Allott had a limited return as a goalscorer and was switched to a right midfield role after the arrival of manager Roy McFarland in 2003, later becoming firmly established in central midfield.

Oldham Athletic 

He returned to Oldham in 2007 as a replacement for Richie Wellens, this time as a central midfielder. His game had improved in this role and his first season back saw him sweep up at the club's Player of the Season awards. However, the following season saw his defensive partner Garry McDonald depart the club to be replaced by Danny Whitaker and although the club started the season well, gaps in the midfield in some games led the club to falter badly from a position in the play-offs to midtable by the end of the season and new manager Dave Penney chose not to keep him at the club.

Chesterfield 
In the summer of 2009, Allot returned to Chesterfield having initially signed a two-year contract with Tranmere Rovers, becoming the club's first signing in the 2009 summer transfer window. However, on 27 July 2009, after managerial changes at both clubs, it was confirmed that Allott had signed a two-year deal with Chesterfield under former Oldham boss John Sheridan, having been released from his contract by Tranmere after only 8 weeks without ever playing a competitive game for the club.

Allott was part of the 2010–11 squad that won League Two and served the club until November 2012 when his contract was cancelled by new manager Paul Cook.

Hyde

On 4 January 2013 he signed for Conference Premier club Hyde. On 1 March 2013 he announced his retirement after just five games for the team, due to injuries.

Honours

Chesterfield
Football League Two (1):2010–11
Football League Trophy (1): 2011–12

References

External links 

1977 births
Living people
English footballers
Oldham Athletic A.F.C. players
Chesterfield F.C. players
Tranmere Rovers F.C. players
Hyde United F.C. players
People from Middleton, Greater Manchester
English Football League players
Association football midfielders
Manchester City F.C. non-playing staff